Darnley Bay  is a large inlet in the Northwest Territories, Canada. It is a southern arm of the Amundsen Gulf.

The Parry Peninsula is to the west and Halcro Point is to the east. The Canadian Shield originates east of Darnley Bay, the terrain sloping upwards, and characterized by glacial deposits.

The bay was named by John Richardson, while travelling with John Franklin during the Second Overland Expedition, for John Bligh, 4th Earl of Darnley.

In 1915, the Canadian Arctic Expedition of 1913-16 was the first to delineate the southern shore of Darnley Bay.

References

Bays of the Northwest Territories
Geography of the Inuvialuit Settlement Region